The Taça dos Campeões Estaduais Rio – São Paulo or simply known Taça dos Campões Estaduais, was a tournament that promoted the clash between the champions of São Paulo state league and Rio de Janeiro state league.

In the majority editions of the competition, the trophy was held in direct specific matches (as well as a Supercup), in others cases, matches from another tournaments such as the Torneio Rio-São Paulo (1957) and Campeonato Brasileiro (1975, 1980, 1987) were used. Due precisely to the success of the Torneio-Rio São Paulo, for several editions there was no interest among the teams to compete. After the creation of the Campeonato Brasileiro in 70's, fewer dates were available in the season, and this also contributed to the dispute being abolished.

List of Champions 

Below is a list of all contested championships, which were in all 25 editions. In 1911 (Taça Salutaris) and in 1917, 1918, 1919 (Taça Ioduran), the concept of the dispute was the same, putting the champions of RJ and SP face to face.

Notes
Due to the World War II (and the fact of Brazil integrates the allied forces), during the year of 1942, Palestra Itália was changed the name to the currently SE Palmeiras. 
The 1926 edition first match was also valid by the Taça Guaraná Espumante Zanotta.
In 1928 edition, America and Corinthians draw by 2–2 in the first match. The second game that was scheduled however was never played.
Palestra Itália was declared champion of the 1934 edition, but the criteria that determined the conquest are not known.
In 1944 edition, Palmeiras and Flamengo draw by 3–3 and did not reach a consensus for the realization of a new match.
1945 edition is also called by Taça da Amizade, and was disputed on April 10, 1946
1947 edition is also called by Taça Mito, and was disputed on 1948.
1955 edition is also called by Troféu Radio Nacional, and was disputed on September 4, 1956.
1957 edition is also valid for a 1958 Torneio-Rio São Paulo match, disputed on April 6, 1958.
1975 edition is also valid for a 1975 Campeonato Brasileiro Série A match, disputed on October 8.
1980 edition is also valid for a 1981 Campeonato Brasileiro Série A match, disputed on February 21, 1981.
1987 edition is also valid for a 1987 Copa União match, disputed on November 15.

List of Champions

Champions by state

See also

Copa dos Campeões Estaduais

References  

Recurring sporting events established in 1913
Recurring sporting events disestablished in 1987
Defunct football competitions in Brazil